Daniel Sabey "Dan" Weld is the Thomas J. Cable/WRF Professor of Computer Science and Engineering at the University of Washington, where he does research in automated planning and scheduling, software agents, and Internet information extraction. He is a venture partner at Madrona Venture Group, a Seattle-based venture capital firm.

Weld was born in 1960 in Boston. He attended high school at Phillips Academy, earned bachelor's degrees in Computer Science and Molecular Biophysics and Biochemistry (1982) from Yale University, and a master's degree (1984) and PhD (1988) in Computer Science from MIT.  He is a Fellow of the Association for Computing Machinery and Association for the Advancement of Artificial Intelligence.

Weld co-founded Netbot Incorporated (1996), which was acquired by Excite; AdRelevance (1998), which was acquired by Media Metrix and then by Nielsen NetRatings; and Nimble Technology (1999), which was acquired by Actuate.

References

External links 
 Daniel Weld's Home Page
 UW page describing "The Intelligence in Wikipedia Project"

Living people
University of Washington faculty
MIT School of Engineering alumni
American computer scientists
Yale University alumni
Fellows of the Association for the Advancement of Artificial Intelligence
Fellows of the Association for Computing Machinery
Phillips Academy alumni
1960 births